Karl Suter (1926–1977) was a Swiss screenwriter and film director. He directed the 1967 Eurospy film Bonditis.

Selected filmography

Director
 The Model Husband (1959)
 The Man in the Black Derby (1960)
  (1961)
 Bonditis (1967)

References

External links

Bibliography 
 Cowie, Peter. World Filmography: 1967. Fairleigh Dickinson Univ Press, 1977.

1926 births
1977 deaths
Swiss screenwriters
Male screenwriters
Swiss film directors
Film people from Zürich
20th-century screenwriters